Vladimir Winkler (1884–1956) was a Czech sculptor best known for early 20th century buildings' facades in Russian Siberia. Born František Winkler, he adopted the name Vladimir when living in Russia.

Biography 
František Winkler was born in 1.6.1885 in Přerov, near Olomouc, in the heart of Moravia, Austro-Hungarian Empire. Since his childhood he was interested in art, and his father sent him to an Industrial Arts school in Prague, after graduating from which, František entered the Prague School of Applied Arts, where he studied in the class of Professor Stanislav Sucharda. Winkler graduated from the school in 1908 and engaged in arts.

World War I, that started in 1914, changed his life. He was a photographer at the Russian-German front and was taken captive. As a prisoner of war, he was sent to Omsk.

At that time, Omsk was passing through the phase of cultural and economic upturn. The city was growing rapidly and had resources to elect monumental administrative buildings, cultural and educational facilities. Omsk needed Winkler's talent to decorate the facades and interiors. In the beginning, he was the only academic sculptor in the region.

Winkler's works include the buildings of New Town Theater (now Omsk Drama Theater), which pediment is topped by his sculpture of a winged genius, Omsk Railway Administration, Commercial School, Chrystal Palace cinema, Court of Justice, Russian Asiatic Society. It is his statues and relief compositions that make these greatest buildings in Omsk stand out.

In early 1918, Winkler went with Czechoslovak Legion to Vladivostok, where he continued his work through the Civil War and several political system changes. New Theater's sculptural decoration, created in 1924, and the monumental composition "The proletarian, breaking the chains around the Earth" on the Palace of Labour mark his Soviet period.

In 1928, he left the Soviet Russia and went to Harbin, China, where many White Russians lived at that time, and again lived through wars and different political regimes, first creating works dedicated to Nicholas II, then to Stalin and Mao Zedong. Winkler died in Harbin in 1956.

References 

Czech sculptors
Czech male sculptors
20th-century Russian sculptors
20th-century Russian male artists
Russian male sculptors
1884 births
1956 deaths